Midnight sky, sky at midnight, or variation, may refer to:

 The Midnight Sky (film), a 2020 post-apocalyptic science-fiction U.S. film
 "Midnight Sky", a 2020 song by Miley Cyrus
 "Midnight Sky (Part 1 & 2)", a 1974 song by The Isley Brothers from Live It Up

See also

 Hot Sky at Midnight (novel), a 1994 novel by Robert Silverberg, see Robert Silverberg bibliography
 In The Midnight Sky (song), a 1989 single by 'Viktor Lazlo' off the album Hot & Soul
 Bison-Black-as-Midnight-Sky (character), a DC Comics fictional character
 
 Midnight star (disambiguation)
 Midnight Sun (disambiguation)
 Midnight (disambiguation)
 Sky (disambiguation)